Kearney Air Force Base is a former United States Army Air Forces (as Kearney Army Airfield) and United States Air Force base located near Kearney, Nebraska.  It was in operation from 1942 through 1949, after which it was decommissioned and turned over for civilian use as Kearney Regional Airport.

See also

 Nebraska World War II Army Airfields

References

 Maurer, Maurer. Air Force Combat Units Of World War II. Washington, DC: U.S. Government Printing Office 1961 (republished 1983, Office of Air Force History).
 Ravenstein, Charles A. Air Force Combat Wings Lineage and Honors Histories 1947–1977. Maxwell Air Force Base, Alabama: Office of Air Force History 1984. .
 Mueller, Robert (1989). Volume 1: Active Air Force Bases Within the United States of America on 17 September 1982.
 ArmyAirForces.Com
USAAS-USAAC-USAAF-USAF Aircraft Serial Numbers--1908 to present
 The Kearney Army Air Base
"Kearney Goes To War," Department of History, University of Nebraska at Kearney

External links
 B-17 Crash historical marker at Wood River, Nebraska
 Kearney AAF Historical Website
 
 

Installations of the United States Air Force in Nebraska
Buildings and structures in Buffalo County, Nebraska
Installations of Strategic Air Command
1949 disestablishments in Nebraska
Military installations closed in 1949
Airfields of the United States Army Air Forces in Nebraska